Miguel Ángel Hernández (born Murcia, 1977) is a Spanish writer. He teaches art history at the University of Murcia, and has published several books on art and visual culture. He is best known for his fictional works, among them the novels Intento de escapada (2013), which won the Premio Ciudad Alcalá de Narrativa and was translated in five languages, and El instante de peligro (2015), which was a finalist for the Premio Herralde de Novela. His latest novel is El dolor de los demás (2018), selected among the books of the year by El País and The New York Times en Español.

Bibliography 
Novels

 Intento de escapada. Anagrama, 2013 (Escape Attempt, Hispabooks, 2016).
 El instante de peligro. Anagrama, 2015. 
 El dolor de los demás. Anagrama, 2018.
 Anoxia. Anagrama, 2023.

Short Stories

 Infraleve: lo que queda en el espejo cuando dejas de mirarte. Editora Regional, 2004.
 Demasiado tarde para volver. Tres Fronteras, 2008.
 Cuaderno [...]duelo. Nausicaa, 2011.

Diaries

 Presente continuo (Diario de una novela). Balduque, 2016.
 Diario de Ithaca. Fundación Newcastle, 2016.
 Aquí y ahora. Diario de escritura. Fórcola, 2019.

References

Spanish writers
Murcian writers
1977 births
Living people